The 2022–23 Valparaiso Beacons men's basketball team represented Valparaiso University in the 2022–23 NCAA Division I men's basketball season. The Beacons, led by seventh-year head coach Matt Lottich, played their home games at the Athletics–Recreation Center in Valparaiso, Indiana as members of the Missouri Valley Conference.

Previous season
The Beacons finished the 2021–22 season 14–18, 6–12 in MVC play to finish in seventh place. They defeated Evansville in the opening round of the MVC tournament, before falling to Missouri State in the quarterfinals.

Roster

Schedule and results

|-
!colspan=12 style=| Exhibition

|-
!colspan=12 style=| Regular season

|-
!colspan=12 style=| MVC Tournament

Sources

References

Valparaiso
Valparaiso Beacons men's basketball seasons
Valparaiso Beacons men's basketball
Valparaiso Beacons men's basketball